Alpu station is a railway station on the Istanbul-Ankara railway in the town of Alpu. The station was formerly served by many passenger trains running along the railway from Istanbul and Izmir towards Ankara and points beyond, but since the opening of the Istanbul-Ankara high-speed railway in 2013, all conventional passenger trains between Istanbul and Ankara were replaced by YHT high-speed service, which runs just south of the town along its own right-of-way. The only passenger train serving the station is the Izmir Blue Train operating daily from Izmir to Ankara.

References

External links
Izmir Blue Train station list
Alpu station information

Railway stations in Eskişehir Province
Railway stations opened in 1892
Buildings and structures in Eskişehir Province
Transport in Eskişehir Province
Alpu District